Evans House No. 2 is a historic home located near Prices Fork, Montgomery County, Virginia, United States.  It was built about 1860, and is a two-story, five-bay, brick dwelling with a center-passage plan.  It has a gable roof, exterior brick end chimneys with stepped shoulders, a hipped roof front porch, and a second front entrance.  Also on the property is a contributing one-story frame mid-19th century outbuilding.

It was listed on the National Register of Historic Places in 1989.

References

Houses on the National Register of Historic Places in Virginia
Houses completed in 1860
Houses in Montgomery County, Virginia
National Register of Historic Places in Montgomery County, Virginia